The Hafei Saibao V is a 4-door compact sedan produced by the Chinese car manufacturer Hafei. The Saibao V compact sedan is slightly larger and positioned above the Saibao III compact sedan. It was designed by Pininfarina.

Overview

The Hafei Saibao V was launched in October 2006, and is based on the same platform as the Saibao III, with the dimensions significantly larger and closer to a midsize sedan. The suspension system uses MacPherson independent suspensions for the front wheels and Multi-link suspensions for the rear with disk brakes as standard for all four wheels.

Powertrain
The regular Hafei Saibao V models are powered by a 1.8-litre (1834 cc) petrol Mitsubishi Orion engine (4G93) producing  and equipped with a 5-speed manual gearbox, with a model that features a 5-speed semi-automatic transmission being powered by a 1.6-litre (1584 cc) petrol (DA746Q) producing .

References

External links
official website

Pininfarina
Cars of China
Sedans
Front-wheel-drive vehicles
Cars introduced in 2006